Central Hawke's Bay District is part of the Hawke's Bay Region in the North Island of New Zealand. Formed in 1989, it has an area of 3,333 square kilometres with a population of  It had a population of 12,717 people as of the 2013 census. This is a decrease of 237 people, or 1.8 percent, since the 2006 census. It covers the area from Pukehou in the north to Takapau in the south, and from the western Ruahine Range to the Pacific coast in the east.

Each of the four corners of the district has a marae. These are at Pukehou, Kairakau, Pōrangahau and Takapau.

History
Central Hawke's Bay District was formed through the 1989 local government reforms by amalgamating Waipukurau and Waipawa districts.

Demographics

Central Hawke's Bay District had a population of 14,142 at the 2018 New Zealand census, an increase of 1,425 people (11.2%) since the 2013 census, and an increase of 1,185 people (9.1%) since the 2006 census. There were 5,418 households, comprising 7,014 males and 7,125 females, giving a sex ratio of 0.98 males per female. The median age was 44.2 years (compared with 37.4 years nationally), with 2,943 people (20.8%) aged under 15 years, 1,974 (14.0%) aged 15 to 29, 6,426 (45.4%) aged 30 to 64, and 2,796 (19.8%) aged 65 or older.

Ethnicities were 83.1% European/Pākehā, 23.7% Māori, 2.9% Pacific peoples, 2.5% Asian, and 1.4% other ethnicities. People may identify with more than one ethnicity.

The percentage of people born overseas was 12.1, compared with 27.1% nationally.

Although some people chose not to answer the census's question about religious affiliation, 50.8% had no religion, 37.2% were Christian, 2.2% had Māori religious beliefs, 0.2% were Hindu, 0.1% were Muslim, 0.3% were Buddhist and 1.6% had other religions.

Of those at least 15 years old, 1,482 (13.2%) people had a bachelor's or higher degree, and 2,631 (23.5%) people had no formal qualifications. The median income was $29,000, compared with $31,800 nationally. 1,128 people (10.1%) earned over $70,000 compared to 17.2% nationally. The employment status of those at least 15 was that 5,640 (50.4%) people were employed full-time, 1,746 (15.6%) were part-time, and 330 (2.9%) were unemployed.

Towns and local government
The district is administered by the Central Hawke's Bay District Council with the seat in the town of  Waipawa. The two main towns are Waipukurau (population ) and Waipawa and smaller townships include Ōtāne, Takapau, Tikokino and Ongaonga. There are also several small beach communities including Kairakau, Pourerere, Aramoana, Blackhead and Pōrangahau.

Central Hawke's Bay District is divided into 2 wards:

 Aramoana-Ruahine
 Ruataniwha

Transportation
State Highway 2 runs through the centre of Central Hawke's Bay leading south to Palmerston North (108 km) and the Wairarapa and north to Hastings (50 km) and Napier. It is 70 kilometres to Napier Port and 75 kilometres to Napier Airport. The Palmerston North – Gisborne railway line runs through the district with one station at Waipukurau. This line connects to the Wairarapa Line at Woodville, and continues through the Manawatu Gorge to Palmerston North.

References

External links

Central Hawke's Bay District Council
Promotional website

 
Districts of New Zealand